The shortspine thornyhead (Sebastolobus alascanus), also known as the channel rockcod, shortspine channel rockfish or spinycheek rockfish, is a species of marine ray-finned fish belonging to the subfamily Sebastinae, the rockfishes, part of the family Scorpaenidae. It is sometimes referred to as the "idiot fish" or "idiot cod" due to its large oversized head and eyes. It is found in the northern and northeastern Pacific Ocean.

Taxonomy
The shortspine thornyhead was first formally described in 1890 by the American ichthyologist Tarleton Hoffman Bean with the type locality given as being off Trinity Islands, near Kodiak Island, in Alaska. The specific name alascanus means "Alaskan" and refers to the type locality.

Description
The dorsal fin has 15 to 17 spines and 8 to 9 soft rays and the anal fin has 3 spines and 4 to 5 soft rays. There is a deep notch in the pectoral fin and the caudal fin is rounded. The general color of this fish is bright red with varying amounts of black on the fins and a pale-colored gill chamber.

Distribution
The shortspine thornyhead is found in the North Pacific Ocean from the Sea of Okhotsk north as far as the Navarin Canyon in the Bering Sea and from Stalemate Bank and Ulm Plateau in the Aleutian Islands east and south to Cedros Island in Baja California.

Biology
Shortspine thornyhead grow slowly and have long lives of possibly up to 80 or 100 years. The females are fertilized internally and extrude the fertilised eggs in pelagic, gelatinous masses. The young fish migrate to deeper water as they mature Spawning occurs between December and May along the Pacific coasts of contiguous United States and between April and May in the Gulf of Alaska. These fishes are predators of shrimp, crabs, zooplankton, amphipods, and other benthic invertebrates. As adults they live predominantly in the oxygen minimum zone (OMZ), and thus require specific adaptations/exaptations in order to overcome the problems posed by the extremely low levels of oxygen saturation. Allowing for an increased ventilation frequency during exposure to progressively hypoxic conditions, as compared to its more shallow relative Scorpaena guttata, enables S. alascanus to compensate for the inherent low concentrations of oxygen in the OMZ. Further, heightened levels of lactate dehydrogenase, specifically the anaerobic isoform- LDH-A in the heart and muscles of S. alascanus, suggests an adaptive mechanism for ATP production during low oxygen availability.

Status
Separate stock assessments for Shortspine thornyhead in the waters off Alaska, British Columbia, and the West Coast of the United States have all estimated the stock as healthy (above the management limits) with overfishing not occurring. The IUCN status is listed as "Endangered" based on an assessment conducted in 2000.

References

Sebastolobus
Fish described in 1890
Taxa named by Tarleton Hoffman Bean
Taxonomy articles created by Polbot